Common names: Ambergris Cay dwarf boa, Caicos Islands dwarf boa, Caicos trope.
Tropidophis greenwayi is a nonvenomous dwarf boa species endemic to the Caicos Islands. Two subspecies are currently recognized, including the nominate subspecies described here.

Etymology
The specific name, greenwayi, is in honor of American ornithologist James Cowan Greenway.

Description

Geographic range
T. greenwayi is found in the West Indies in the Caicos Islands, particularly on the islands of Ambergris Cay, Long Cay, Middle Caicos, Middleton Cay, North Caicos, South Caicos, and probably also on Providenciales. The type locality given is "Ambergris Cay, Caicos Islands, Bahamas".

Habitat
T. greenwayi occurs in the rocky limestone areas of the cays, in shrubland, forest, and rural gardens.

Conservation
Because of its restricted island distribution, T. greenway is susceptible to extirpation. Unless wildlife protection laws are enforced, the relatively secretive nature of this snake may be its only protection against extinction.

Diet
The diet of T. greenwayi consists mainly of anoles, geckos, and frogs.

Reproduction
T. greenwayi is viviparous.

Subspecies

References

Further reading
Barbour T, Shreve B (1936). "New Races of Tropidophis and of Ameiva from the Bahamas". Proceedings of the New England Zoological Club 16: 1-3. (Tropidophis pardalis greenwayi, new subspecies, p. 2).
Schwartz A (1963). "A new subspecies of Tropidophis greenwayi from the Caicos Bank". Breviora (194): 1-6. (Tropidophis greenwayi lanthanus, new subspecies).
Schwartz A, Henderson RW (1991). Amphibians and Reptiles of the West Indies: Descriptions, Distributions, and Natural History. Gainesville: University of Florida Press. 720 pp. . (Tropidophis greenwayi, p. 634).
Schwartz A, Marsh RJ (1960). "A review of the pardalis-maculatus complex of the boid genus Tropidophis of the West Indies". Bulletin of the Museum of Comparative Zoology at Harvard College 123 (2): 50-84.
Schwartz A, Thomas R (1975). A Check-list of West Indian Amphibians and Reptiles. Carnegie Museum of Natural History Special Publication No. 1. Pittsburgh, Pennsylvania: Carnegie Museum of Natural History. 216 pp. (Tropidophis greenwayi'', pp. 192–193).

External links

Tropidophiidae
Reptiles described in 1936
Taxa named by Thomas Barbour
Taxa named by Benjamin Shreve
Fauna of the Turks and Caicos Islands
Snakes of the Caribbean
Endemic fauna of the Caribbean